Frögärd Ulvsdotter i Ösby (11th century) was a Swedish Norse woman. She was according to a common misconception believed to be a Viking Age female runemaster. This notion is based on Erik Brate's  erroneous interpretation of runestone U 203. As early as 1943, Elias Wessén convincingly demonstrated that the sequence in question cannot be read as a carver's signature. Also, the place name uisby should be read Väsby rather than Ösby.

U 203 was raised by Ale (or Alle) in memory of his son Ulv, “father to Frögärd in Väsby”. Ale (Alle) is also responsible for runestone U 194, which he raised in memory of himself while he was still alive. According to this inscription, Ale (Alle) received a share of Canute the Great’s Danegeld in 1017. Thus, Frögärd was probably a member of a wealthy family and the only beneficiary of her father's and grandfather's inheritance. Birgit Sawyer suggests that Ale's (Alle's) purpose with U 203 could have been to take care of his underage granddaughter's inheritance.

Both U 194 and U 203 are carved by Åsmund Kåresson.

An actual Swedish female Viking Age runemaster was Gunnborga.

References

11th-century Swedish people
Runemasters
11th-century deaths
Year of birth unknown
11th-century Swedish women